Bagrat III (1495-1565), of the Bagrationi dynasty, was a King of Imereti from April 1, 1510, to 1565. He succeeded upon the death of his father, Alexander II, and faced repeated assaults from the Ottoman Turks as well as the conflicts with his ostensible vassal princes of Mingrelia, Guria, and Abkhazia who were frequently joining the enemy.

Reign 

In 1512, the Ottomans invaded Imereti through its southern neighbor Samtskhe and unexpectedly struck Bagrat’s capital Kutaisi.

After the Ottoman army left Imereti, Bagrat launched a program of restoration, reorganized the church, and enforced a law condemning to death all who engaged in slave trading practiced by the Turks in conjunction with some Georgian nobles. In 1533, he persuaded Mamia I Gurieli of Guria and Mamia III Dadiani of Mingrelia to organize a combined and eventually disastrous expedition against the piratical North Caucasian tribe of Zichi which had come under the Turkish influence. Despite this setback, Bagrat now decided to deliver a blow to the Ottoman positions in southern Georgia. In 1535, he invaded the principality of Samtskhe, which was exploited by the Turks as a portal for their incursions into inner Georgian lands. At the Battle of Murjakheti near Akhalkalaki, Bagrat defeated and captured Qvarqvare III Jaqeli, prince-atabeg of Samtskhe, and annexed a bulk of his possessions to Imereti. At the request of Qvarqvare’s son Kaikhosro, the Ottoman army invaded Imereti, only to put to flight by Bagrat and his ally Rostom, prince of Guria. The prince of Mingrelia, Levan I Dadiani, however, defied Bagrat’s call to arms, and later sided with the Ottomans, even traveling to Istanbul, where he received gifts and assurances of protection.

In 1545, Bagrat and his ally Luarsab I of Kartli suffered a bitter defeat at the Battle of Sokhoista in 1545. As a result, Samtskhe wrested of Bagrat’s control, and came under the Ottoman hegemony. In the following years, the principalities of Mingrelia and Guria also asserted their de facto independence from the crown of Imereti, further reducing the royal power. In 1555, in the Treaty of Amasya, the Ottoman and Persian empires divided Georgia, with Imereti falling into the Ottoman sphere of influence. Bagrat attempted to disrupt the Turco-Persian deal by pushing claims to the town of Surami which lay in the Persian zone in eastern Georgia. The move brought to nothing, however, and Bagrat was forced to pay tribute to the Ottomans. He died in 1565 and was succeeded by his son, George II.

Family 
Bagrat was married to a certain woman named Elene who died in 1565. He had four sons and two daughters:
 George II (died 1585), King of Imereti (1565–1585).
 Prince Constantine (died 1587), anti-king of Imereti (1585–1586).
 Prince Teimuraz (fl. 1514 – 1583), father of King Bagrat IV of Imereti.
 Prince Vakhtang (fl. 1520 – fl. 1565).
 Princess Tamar (died 1556), queen consort of Luarsab I of Kartli. 
 Anonymous daughter who married Prince Ramaz Bagration-Davitishvili.

References

 Вахушти Багратиони (Vakhushti Bagrationi) (1745). История Царства Грузинского: Жизнь Имерети.

Bagrationi dynasty of the Kingdom of Imereti
Kings of Imereti
1495 births
1565 deaths
16th-century people from Georgia (country)
Eastern Orthodox monarchs